Ghosted is a 2011 British drama film directed by Craig Viveiros.

Cast 
 John Lynch as Jack
 David Schofield as Donner
 Martin Compston as Paul
 Craig Parkinson as Clay
 Art Malik as Ahmed
 Amanda Abbington as Tracy
 Hugh Quarshie as Ade

References

External links 

2011 drama films
2011 films
British drama films
2010s English-language films
2010s British films